The School of Agricultural and Life Sciences (Ecole Nationale Supérieure Agronomique de Toulouse) is a French public and national Grande Ecole in agricultural and life sciences, funded by the Ministry of Higher Education and Research and member of Toulouse Tech. The ENSAT is a school of the National Polytechnic Institute of Toulouse (INPT), a university federating several schools dealing with engineering, agriculture and veterinary sciences, chemistry, meteorology.

ENSAT works with seven laboratories joint to INRA or CNRS, and several industrial partners.

History
Founded in 1909 by Paul Sabatier, Nobel prize in chemistry, the institute became ENSAT in 1970 and  joined forces with INP-ENSIACET and INP-ENSEEIHT to create the National Polytechnic Institute of Toulouse.

Training
ENSAT's mission is to offer training, research and expertise, based on the specialities of the research teams: Food, Sustainable Agriculture, Biotechnology, Environment and Territories.  International students have the opportunity to prepare for an Engineer’s degree in Agricultural Sciences (equivalent to a master's degree), several master's degrees in Agricultural Sciences, Food Sciences or Environmental Sciences, and the possibility of completing a PhD.

Research
There are seven research teams working on: 
 Chemistry Laboratory (LGC)
 Impact of farming and forestry on ecosystems (DYNAFOR)
 Biogeochemical functions of ecosystems (ECOLAB)
 Genomics and biotechnology of fruit (GBF)
 Agro-systems and rural development (AGIR)
 Animal production and nutrition (TANDEM)
 Socio-economy of rural territories (DYNAMIQUES RURALES)

Programs for exchange students
ENSAT cooperates with institutions all over the world through student exchanges with other European countries (ERASMUS), Latin America as well as with the U.S. and Canada.

Exchange students can select a list of courses within the following programs: 
 ENSAT Agro-engineer’s programme (courses in French), in one of the options:
Plant Bio sciences – Biotechnology, plant breeding, plant protection
Agro-geomatics – Remote sensing, GIS
Agro-Management – Project management, Business Administration, Marketing 
Food Industry – Innovation and product quality
Animal Production – Sectors and product quality
Environmental Engineering – Water and waste management and treatments
Environmental quality and resources management – risk management, management of agricultural impact on environment
Agricultural production systems, environment, territories – sustainable development and land use
Agro-resources – Green chemistry, bio-fuels, bio-materials, biocosmetics

Other training
 National Diploma in Oenology (courses in French) A two-year programme dedicated to professional training in the sectors of viticulture, wine making and oenology.
 Master “Agrofood Chain” (courses in English) – A multidisciplinary programme to create awareness of scientific, social and economic realities of the modern agrofood industry and to provide scientific and practical training in an international context.

References

External links
 

Agronomy schools
Forestry education
Toulouse Institute of Technology
University of Toulouse
Universities and colleges in Toulouse
Technical universities and colleges in France